Café Express is a 1980 Italian comedy film directed by Nanni Loy and starring Nino Manfredi.

Plot
Michele Abbagnano (Nino Manfredi) ekes out a living by abusively selling coffee, hot milk and cappuccino on the night trains running between Naples and Vallo della Lucania; each night, his goods held in a set of vacuum flasks which he carries in a basket along with handfuls of sugar packets he steals from railway cafés, he moves from carriage to carriage peddling warm drinks to the dazed, sleepy passengers.

The need to maintain his young son (who suffers from a congenital heart deficiency) in an institution and the hope to amass a large enough sum to have him undergo surgery to make him healthy for good is more than enough to keep Michele in his awkward and exhausting line of business, to which, however, he's exceptionally suited.

Keen of eye and wit he manages to befriend most of the passengers on the night trains, helping them with small favours (like waking them up before the stations they need to descend at) and telling tall tales centered on his right arm, which he keeps wrapped in a long leather glove pretending it to be wooden.

Michele tailors the stories to the people he's telling them to...pretending of having been a successful pianist who had his career ruined to a young cross-eyed man pining about having been rejected from the Carabinieri, telling how he saved orphanage boys from a roaring fire to the nun leading some schoolboys, narrating how he lost the limb to freezing on the Eastern Front to the WW2 veteran and so on.

During one night of 'work' Michele will be chased across the train by a trio of conductors who have been ordered by the Ministry of Transports to put an end to his activities once and for all; he'll meet his son (who has escaped from the institution) and will cross paths with a trio of petty thieves decided to enroll him as an accomplice in their misdeeds.

Cast
 Nino Manfredi - Michele Abbagnano
 Adolfo Celi - chief inspector Ramacci-Pisanelli of the Ministry of Transportation
 Vittorio Caprioli - Improta, chief of the pickpockets
 Vittorio Mezzogiorno - Diodato "mad man" Amitrano, Improta's accomplice
 Antonio Allocca - Califano, Improta's accomplice
 Gigi Reder - Antonio Cammarota, the stretcher-bearer
 Silvio Spaccesi - Giuseppe Sanguigno, train conductor
 Gerardo Scala - Nicola Scognamiglio, train controller (the cooled one)
 Luigi Basagaluppi - Vigorito, train controller (the drunkard one) 
 Marisa Laurito - Liberata, Ferdinando's lover
 Marzio Honorato - Ferdinando, Liberata's lover
 Vittorio Marsiglia - Picone, the neapolitan businessman
 Maurizio Micheli - The piedmontese businessman
 Clara Colosimo - Valmarana, the piedmontese businesswoman
 Giovanni Piscopo - Michele's son, nicknamed Cazzillo
 Leo Gullotta - Imbastaro, the cross-eyed man
 Tano Cimarosa - Panepino, railroad police officer
 Lina Sastri - Mother Camilla, a nun
 Ester Carloni - the old passenger
 Nino Terzo - Zappacosta, stationmaster of Vallo della Lucania
 Italo Celoro - the worker with bandaged finger
 Nino Vingelli - the trickster dressed as a priest
 Franca Scagnetti - the passenger leaving the bathroom

Awards
Nino Manfredi won a Nastro d'Argento as best male protagonist in this film.

See also   
 List of Italian films of 1980

References

External links

1980 films
1980s Italian-language films
1980 comedy films
Films directed by Nanni Loy
Commedia all'italiana
Rail transport films
Films set in Campania
Films set in Naples
1980s Italian films